Energia is a moth genus of the family Depressariidae.

Species
 Energia inopina Walsingham, 1912
 Energia subversa Walsingham, 1912

References

Stenomatinae
Moth genera
Taxa named by Thomas de Grey, 6th Baron Walsingham